Lebanese Americans are Americans of Lebanese descent. This includes both those who are native to the United States of America, as well as immigrants from Lebanon.

Lebanese Americans comprise 0.79% of the American population, as of the American Community Survey estimations for year 2007, and 32.4% of all Americans who originate from the Middle East. Lebanese Americans have had significant participation in American politics and involvement in both social and political activism.  The diversity within the region sprouted from the diaspora of the surrounding countries. There are more Lebanese outside Lebanon today than within.

History 

The first known Lebanese immigrant to the United States was Antonio Bishallany, a Maronite Christian, who arrived in Boston Harbor in 1854. He died in Brooklyn, New York in 1856 on his 29th birthday. Large scale-Lebanese immigration began in the late 19th century and settled mainly in Brooklyn and Boston, Massachusetts. They were marked as Syrians; almost all of the immigrants were Christians. Upon entering America, many of them worked as peddlers. The first wave continued until the 1920s. Many immigrants settled in northern New Jersey, in towns such as Bloomfield, Paterson, Newark, and Orange. 
Some immigrants set out west, with places such as Detroit, Cleveland, Toledo, and Peoria gaining a large number of all Lebanese immigrants. Others bought farms in states like Texas, South Dakota, and Iowa. Many came via the United Kingdom, including a large number on the ill-fated liner RMS Titanic.

The second wave of Lebanese immigration began in the late 1940s and continued through the early 1990s, when Lebanese immigrants had been fleeing the Lebanese Civil War. Between 1948 and 1990, over 60,000 Lebanese entered the United States. Since then, immigration has slowed to an estimated 5,000 immigrants a year, and those who now settle are predominantly Muslim, in contrast to the predominantly-Christian population of immigrants of previous waves. Christians still comprise a majority of Lebanese in America and in the diaspora of around 14 million Lebanese people living outside Lebanon.

Religion
Most of the Lebanese immigrants during the first and the early part of the second waves were Christians. Muslims followed in large numbers beginning in the late 1960s. Among the minority, there are Shia and Sunni Muslim communities. A number of Jews fled Lebanon for the United States due to fears of persecution, and populations of Druze and atheists also exist. This information has been distributed by all American organizations, including the Arab American Institute and the United States census team.

The United States is the second largest home of Druze communities outside the Middle East after Venezuela (60,000). According to some estimates there are about 30,000 to 50,000 Druzes in the United States, with the largest concentration in Southern California. Most Druze immigrated to the U.S. from Lebanon and Syria.

Demographics 

Dearborn, Michigan has the highest concentration of Arab Americans in the United States, at over 40%. The rest of Metro Detroit has an even larger population of Lebanese residents. Brooklyn, New York has one of the oldest Lebanese populations in America, dating over 125 years; one large center is in the Bay Ridge section. Once predominantly Christian, the Lebanese in Bay Ridge are today equally split between Muslims and Christians. South Paterson, New Jersey historically had a large Lebanese Christian population dating back to the 1890s, but only a few remain, and the neighborhood has largely been replaced by  Palestinian immigrants. Brooklyn holds a significant Lebanese community, with a Maronite Cathedral the center of one of two eparchies for Maronite Lebanese in the United States, the other being in Los Angeles. Lebanese Americans are categorized as White for census purposes.

Easton, Pennsylvania; Utica, New York; San Diego, California; Jacksonville, Florida; Sterling Heights, Michigan; Los Angeles County; San Francisco, California; Peoria, Illinois; Grosse Pointe, Michigan; Miami, Florida; Wichita, Kansas; Bloomfield, Michigan; Fall River, Massachusetts; Worcester, Massachusetts; Boston, Massachusetts; Methuen, Massachusetts; Lawrence, Massachusetts; Salem, New Hampshire; Cleveland, Ohio; Lansing, Michigan; East Grand Rapids, Michigan; Lafayette, Louisiana; St. Clair Shores, Michigan; Toledo, Ohio; the Dallas-Fort Worth metroplex; El Paso, Texas; Austin, Texas; San Antonio, Texas and Houston, Texas also have sizeable Lebanese communities.

The Arab American Institute reports the top five states where Lebanese Americans reside are: Michigan (11%), California (9%), Ohio (6%), Florida (6%), and Massachusetts (5%).

See also

List of Lebanese Americans
Lebanon–United States relations

References

Further reading
 Jones, J. Sydney, and Paula Hajar. "Lebanese Americans." in Gale Encyclopedia of Multicultural America, edited by Thomas Riggs, (3rd ed., vol. 3, Gale, 2014), pp. 79-90. Online
 Kayal, Philip, and Joseph Kayal. The Syrian Lebanese in America: A Study in Religion and Assimilation (Twayne, 1975).
 Price, Jay M., and Sue Abdinnour, "Family, Ethnic Entrepreneurship, and the Lebanese of Kansas," Great Plains Quarterly, 33 (Summer 2013), 161–88.
 Shakir, Evelyn. Remember Me to Lebanon: Stories of Lebanese Women in America (Syracuse University Press, 2007).
 Thernstrom, Stephan; Orlov, Ann; Handlin, Oscar, eds. ''Harvard Encyclopedia of American Ethnic Groups''. Harvard University Press. .

External links

Arab American
 
 
United States
Lebanese emigrants to the United States
Middle Eastern American

fr:Libano-Américains